Anna Maria is a city in Manatee County, Florida, United States. The population was 968 at the 2020 census, down from 1,503 in 2010. The city occupies the northern part of Anna Maria Island and is one of three municipalities on the island. The others are Holmes Beach in the center and Bradenton Beach in the south.

Anna Maria is part of the Bradenton-Sarasota-Venice, Florida Metropolitan Statistical Area.

Etymology
Former Tampa Mayor Madison Post (1818-1867) named the island for his wife Maria and his sister-in-law Anna. A popular legend, however, states that Ponce de Leon named the island for Maria Anna von der Pfalz-Neuburg, the queen of Charles II of Spain, the sponsor of his expedition.

In the past, pronunciation of the name differed: old timers said "Anna Mar-EYE-a," but most people today say "Anna Mar-EE-a."

History
In 1893, George Emerson Bean built a home near the present day Rod & Real Pier. Prior to Bean's homestead claim, Andrew Gowanlack would reside in the area where Bean would file his homestead at. However, Andrew never filed for a homestead claim but did receive three acres of land after Bean filed his homestead claim out of squatting rights. After George Bean's death in 1898, the land went to his son, George Wilhelm Bean, who partnered with Charles Roser, a wealthy real estate developer from St. Petersburg, to form the Anna Maria Beach Company to develop the area.

In 1911, the Anna Maria City Pier would be built by the Anna Maria Beach Company to accommodate steamships carrying residents and visitors to the island. The pier would have several buildings attached to it. An extension of the pier containing a home would be built in 1913 before the area the house was on in the pier was destroyed in September 1927. Sometime during 1927, a jail would be built as a form of containment for bar patrons who were rowdy and was used until 1940 when a fire would burn down its roof and cells.
 
Compiled in the late 1930s and first published in 1939, the Florida Guide listed Anna Maria's population as 77 describing it as:

Bradenton would attempt to annex the City of Anna Maria in 1963. Anna Maria would hold a special election that was described as being "non-official" on April 2, 1963, to confirm Bradenton's decision. However, it would not be approved as 297 voted against it while 9 voted in favor of it.

During Hurricane Irma in 2017, the city pier was damaged significantly. It was demolished the following year with plans to rebuilt it. The historic city pier was rebuilt and opened in April of 2020.

Geography

It is bordered to the southwest by the Gulf of Mexico and to the northeast by Tampa Bay, connected to the Gulf by Passage Key Inlet at the northwest end of the island. The city is bordered to the southeast by Holmes Beach.

Demographics

As of the census of 2000, there were 1,814 people, 897 households, and 572 families residing in the city. The population density was 2,338.3 inhabitants per square mile (897.9/km2). The racial makeup of the city was 98.18% White, 0.33% African American, 0.11% Native American, 0.28% Asian, 0.44% from other races, and 0.66% from two or more races. Hispanic or Latino of any race were 2.48% of the population.

There were 897 households, out of which 14.3% had children under the age of 18 living with them, 55.4% were married couples living together, 6.5% had a female householder with no husband present, and 36.2% were non-families. 29.9% of all households were made up of individuals, and 16.4% had someone living alone who was 65 years of age or older. The average household size was 2.02 and the average family size was 2.46.

In the city, the population was spread out, with 12.5% under the age of 18, 3.3% from 18 to 24, 14.9% from 25 to 44, 36.2% from 45 to 64, and 33.2% who were 65 years of age or older. The median age was 56 years. For every 100 females, there were 90.3 males. For every 100 females age 18 and over, there were 88.3 males.

The median income for a household in the city was $40,341, and the median income for a family was $51,628. Males had a median income of $40,125 versus $24,934 for females. The per capita income for the city was $28,767. About 10.8% of families and 10.5% of the population were below the poverty line, including 13.1% of those under age 18 and 14.7% of those age 65 or over. The average value of a single-family residential home in the city is over $1.8 Million Dollars.

References

External links
 
 
 Local News for the City of Anna Maria

Cities in Manatee County, Florida
Anna Maria Island
Beaches of Manatee County, Florida
Sarasota metropolitan area
Cities in Florida
Populated coastal places in Florida on the Gulf of Mexico
1925 establishments in Florida
Beaches of Florida
Populated places established in 1925